This is a list of notable people who were born or have lived in Novosibirsk (1893–1926: Novonikolayevsk), Russia.

Born in Novosibirsk

1901–1930 
 Arseny Sokolov (1910–1986), theoretical physicist
 Alexander Pokryshkin (1913–1985), Soviet flying ace and a Marshal of the Soviet Air Force; Hero of the Soviet Union
 Veniamin Nechayev (1915-1987), Soviet musician (guitarist) and film actor, the member of the estrada duet of Nechayev & Rudakov, which was popular in the 1950s, Merited Artist of the Russian Soviet Federative Socialist Republic (1961)
 Vsevolod Blinkov (1918–1987), football player and a bandy player
 Nikolai Kopilov (1919–1995), chess player
 Oleg Tolmachev (1919–2008), Soviet ice hockey player and coach
 Yury Karandin (born 1923), IIHF Hall of Fame inductee
 Yevgeni Andreyev (1926–2000), colonel in the Soviet Air Force
 Valentin Kuzin (1926–1994), ice hockey player
 Vladimir Yakubovich (1926–2012), control theorist
 Aleksandr Zatsepin (born 1926), composer
 Arkady Vaksberg (1927–2011), lawyer, writer, film maker and playwright

1931–1950 
 Eduard Artemyev (born 1937), composer of electronic music and film scores
 Yuriy Nazarov (born 1937), actor
 Gainan Saidkhuzhin (1937–2015), Russian Tatar cyclist and ten-time cycling champion of the Soviet Union
 Yury Yershov (born 1940), mathematician
 Yevgeny Kharitonov (1941–1981), writer, poet, playwright and theater director
 Thomas Sanderling (born 1942), German conductor
 Alexander Gavrilov (born 1943), pair skater
 Anatoly Koteshev (born 1944), fencer
 Yury Komarov (born 1945), businessman
 Valery Ilyinykh (1947–1982), gymnast
 Israel Shamir (born 1947), writer and journalist
 Vladimir Zubkov (born 1948), wrestler
 Vladimir Paznikov (1949–2008), Soviet international speedway rider

1951–1960 
 Irina Alfyorova (born 1951), actress
 Vladimir Antyufeyev (born 1951), Soviet OMON police officer, Minister of State Security of Transnistria (1992–2011)
 Sergei Kourdakov (1951–1973), KGB agent and naval officer
 Alexander Akimov (1953–1986), shift supervisor of the night crew that worked at the Chernobyl Nuclear Power Plant Unit #4 on the night of the accident, on April 26, 1986
 Nina Mikhailovna Sadur (born 1950), playwright and prose writer
 Viktor Tolokonsky (born 1953), politician
 Tatyana Zolotnitskaya (born 1955), freestyle swimmer
 Anatoly Lokot (born 1959), mayor of Novosibirsk
 Irina Strakhova (born 1959), race walker
 Marina Gershenovich (born 1960), poet and translator

1961–1970 
 Andrey Perlov (born 1961), race walker
 Olga Voshchakina (born 1961), fencer
 Aleksei Maklakov (born 1962), actor and singer
 Andrei Panin (1962–2013), actor and director
 Oleg Postnov (born 1962), author, university professor, philologist and a literary critic
 Oleg Sudakov (born 1962), musician, poet, artist and publicist
 Liliya Vasilchenko (1962–2011), cross-country skier
 Natalia Fileva (1963–2019), aviation executive and millionaire
 Irina Laricheva (born 1963), swimmer
 Alexander Goldin (born 1964), chess grandmaster
 Vadim Kuzmin (1964–2012), musician
 Alena Ledeneva (born 1964), Professor of Politics and Society at the School of Slavonic and East European Studies, University College London
 Dmitry Selivanov (1964–1989), rock singer
 Vladimir Strelchenko (born 1964), mayor of Khimki
 Andrey Zvyagintsev (born 1964), film director and actor
 Aleksander Barkov (born 1965), professional ice hockey coach
 Grigory Kiriyenko (born 1965), fencer
 Eugene Nalimov (born 1965), chess programmer
 Sergey Surovikin (born 1966), Commander of the Russian Aerospace Forces
 Yanka Dyagileva (1966–1991), poet and singer-songwriter
 Aleksandr Karelin (born 1967), Greco-Roman wrestler and a Hero of the Russian Federation
 Ivan Kulakov (born 1967), geophysicist and artist
 Igor Polyansky (born 1967), backstroke swimmer
 Roman Stolyar (born 1967), composer, piano improviser and educator
 Vyacheslav Shalygin (born 1968), science fiction writer
 Andrei Tarasenko (born 1968), ice hockey player
 Evgeni Kisurin (born 1969), basketball player

1971–1975 
 Vladislav Bobrik (born 1971), road bicycle racer
 Larisa Merk (born 1971), rower
 Vadim Repin (born 1971), Belgian-Russian violinist
 Dmitry Shorin (born 1971), artist and sculptor
 Dmitry Zatonsky (born 1971), ice hockey forward
 Olga Nikolaeva (born 1972), volleyball player
 Ruben Aganbegyan (born 1972), economist
 Anton Mordasov (born 1972), pianist
 Tatiana Malinina (born 1973), figure skater
 Tatiana Moskvina (born 1973), Russian-born Belarusian judoka
 Stanislav Pozdnyakov (born 1973), fencer
 Sergey Tatevosyan (born 1973), professional boxer
 Mitya Fomin (born 1974), singer, dancer and producer
 Sergei Klimovich (born 1974), professional ice hockey center
 Maxim Vengerov (born 1974), Israeli violinist, violist and conductor
 Alexander Medvedev (born 1975), Russian singer known by his stage name Shura
 Evgeny Shaldybin (born 1975), professional ice hockey player
 Sergei Zhukov (born 1975), professional ice hockey player

1976–1980 
 Anton Chermashentsev (born 1976), Olympic rower
 Yan Golubovsky (born 1976), professional ice hockey player
 Vladimir Komarov (born 1976), musician, singer, songwriter, sound producer, DJ and journalist
 Ivan Roudyk (born 1976), house DJ
 Alexander Ustinov (born 1976), Belarusian professional boxer, kickboxer and mixed martial artist
 Konstantin Gorovikov (born 1977), ice hockey forward
 Denis Laktionov (born 1977), football player
 Dmitri Nabokov (born 1977), professional ice hockey forward
 Yevgeni Podgorny (born 1977), Olympic gymnast
 Ekaterina Vinogradova (born 1977), biathlete and cross-country skier
 Denis Inkin (born 1978), professional boxer
 Anna Tsygankova (born 1979), ballet dancer
 Tatiana Burina (born 1980), ice hockey forward
 Irina Dzyuba (born 1980), Russian rhythmic gymnast
 Aleksandr Nikolaenko (born 1980), badminton player

1981–1985 
 Maria Guerassimenko (born 1981), pair skater
 Dmitry Bocharov (born 1982), chess grandmaster
 Vladimir Gusev (born 1982), professional ice hockey defenceman
 Artyom Kryukov (born 1982), professional ice hockey forward
 Lyubov Shutova (born 1983), fencer, world champion in 2009 and team world champion in 2013 and 2014
 Olesya Syreva (born 1983), middle/long-distance runner
 Anna Kikina (born 1984), engineer and test cosmonaut
 Anton Tokarev (born 1984), pair skater
 Pavel Podkolzin (born 1985), professional basketball player
 Konstantin Shamray (born 1985), pianist
 Irina Ufimtseva (born 1985), Olympics freestyle swimmer

1986–1990 
 Konstantin Alexeyev (born 1988), professional ice hockey defenceman
 Valentina Artemyeva (born 1986), breaststroke swimmer
 Ilia Chernousov (born 1986), cross-country skier
 Grigori Chirkin (born 1986), professional footballer
 Youlia Fedossova (born 1988), French female tennis player
 Igor Gorokhov (born 1990), ice hockey defenceman
 Maxim Gratchev (born 1988), ice hockey player
 Yuliya Gavrilova (born 1989), sabre fencer
 Yekaterina Ilyukhina (born 1987), snowboarder
 Maksim Ishkeldin (1990–2021), bandy player
 Max Jenkins (born 1986), American professional racing cyclist
 Dmitriy Koshkin (born 1986), alpine skier
 Yuri Larionov (born 1986), pair skater
 Artyom Loskutov (born 1986), performance artist and an activist
 Aleksandr Makarenko (born 1986), professional footballer
 Vladimir Markelov (born 1987), professional ice hockey forward
 Egor Milovzorov (born 1987), professional ice hockey forward
 Pelageya (born 1986), singer
 Veniamin Reshetnikov (born 1986), sabre fencer, European champion in 2009, world champion in 2013, three-time team world champion (2010, 2011 and 2013) and three-time team European champion (2007, 2009 and 2012)
 Vladimir Rykov (born 1987), professional football player
 Vitaliy Sidorov (born 1990), professional football player
 Daniil Simkin (born 1987), ballet dancer and principal dancer with American Ballet Theatre
 Mikhail Simonyan (born 1986), violinist
 Michail Tsarev (born 1986), mixed martial artist
 Roman Vlasov (born 1990), Greco-Roman wrestler
 Irina Zaryazhko (born 1989), volleyball player
 Alena Zavarzina (born 1989), snowboarder
 Georgi Zotov (born 1990), professional football player

1991–2000 
 Alexei Antsiferov (born 1991), professional ice hockey forward
 Yevgeni Gapon (born 1991), professional footballer
 Maxim Ignatovich (born 1991), professional ice hockey player
 Alexey Sobolev (born 1991), snowboarder
 Evgeny Nechkasov (born 1991), philosopher and neopaganism ideologist
 Nikita Ignatyev (born 1992), artistic gymnast
 Vladimir Morozov (born 1992), swimmer
 Roman Tatalin (born 1992), professional ice hockey defenceman
 Denis Bachurin (born 1993), professional ice hockey defenceman
 Yegor Korshkov (born 1996), ice hockey player
 Elizaveta Kulichkova (born 1996), tennis player
 Vladimir Pashkevich (born 1996), football player
 Ivan Stretovich (born 1996), artistic gymnast
 Grigori Denisenko (born 2000), ice hockey player

Lived in Novosibirsk 
 Mikhail Lavrentyev (1900–1980), mathematician and hydrodynamicist; professor at Novosibirsk State University (1959–1966)
 Ilia Vekua (1907–1977), Soviet-Georgian mathematician; first rector of Novosibirsk State University (1959–1964)
 Alexey Okladnikov (1908–1981), archaeologist, historian and ethnographer; Professor and Head, Department of History, of Novosibirsk State University (1962–1981)
 Aleksandr Aleksandrov (1912–1999), mathematician, physicist, philosopher and mountaineer; lived from 1964 to 1986 in Novosibirsk, heading the Laboratory of Geometry of the Institute of Mathematics of the Siberian Division of the USSR Academy of Sciences, teaching at Novosibirsk State University
 Samson Kutateladze (1914-1986), physicist; professor at Novosibirsk State University
 Dmitry Belyayev (1917–1985), geneticist and academician; his decades-long effort to breed domesticated foxes was described by The New York Times as “arguably the most extraordinary breeding experiment ever conducted”
 Gersh Budker (1918–1977), physicist; became one of the founders of Faculty of Physics of Novosibirsk State University in 1961
 Yegor Ligachyov (1920–2021), politician; First Secretary of the Novosibirsk Komsomol, before becoming Deputy Chairman of the Novosibirsk Soviet, and then Secretary of the Novosibirsk Obkom between 1959 and 1961
 Valentin Koptyug (1931–1997), scientist; chancellor of Novosibirsk State University (1978–1980)
 Rostislav Shilo (1940-2016), director of the Novosibirsk Zoo (1969-2016), honorary citizen of Novosibirsk
 Semën Kutateladze (born 1945), mathematician; professor at Novosibirsk State University
 Anatoly Kvashnin (1946-2022), Hero of the Russian Federation (1999), military and civilian official, the Chief of the General Staff of Russian Armed Forces (1997-2004), Army general (1997), the Plenipotentiary Representative of the President of Russia in the Siberian Federal District (2004-2010), 1st class Active state councillor of the Russian Federation (2004)
 Vladimir Gorodetsky (born 1948), mayor of Novosibirsk (2000–2014); Governor of Novosibirsk Oblast (2014-2017); senator of Russian Federation Council since 2018
 Zinaida Amosova (born 1950), cross-country skier, training at the Armed Forces sports society in Novosibirsk
 Joseph Werth (born 1952), Bishop of Transfiguration in Novosibirsk
 Tatyana Snezhina (1972-1995), poet and singer-songwriter
 Aleksandr Butko (born 1986), setter, plays for Lokomotiv Novosibirsk; also in the Russian Olympic men's volleyball team
 Vladimir Tarasenko (born 1991), professional ice hockey right winger, played in the system of Sibir Novosibirsk organization

Novosibirsk
List